Corvo  is a surname. It is derived from a nickname is the Italian, Portuguese, and Galician,  literally meaning "raven" or "rook", from Latin corvus. In Spanish the word has the meaning "crooked bend" (Latin: curvus) The Spanish variant of "raven" is "Cuervo". Notable people with the surname include:

Alberto Corvo (born 1963), Italian middle-distance runner 
 Alex Corvo, Australian rugby league player and trainer
 Baron Corvo (1860–1913), pseudonym of writer Frederick Rolfe 
 Joe Corvo (born 1977), American ice hockey player in the NHL
 Mark Corvo (born 1973), Australian rugby league player 
 Massimo Corvo (born 1959), Italian actor
Rafael E. López-Corvo, Venezuelan-born medical doctor, psychiatrist and psychoanalyst

See also

 Cuervo, the Spanish-language variant
Corbo (surname), central-southern variant of Italian "corvo"

References

Surnames from nicknames